The 1997–98 Moldovan "A" Division season is the 7th since its establishment. A total of 14 teams are contesting the league.

League table

Promotion/relegation play-off

First Leg [Dubasari, Jun 18]
Energhetic Dubăsari 0–2 Agro Chișinău
(Svaga, Frunze)

Second Leg [Chisinau, Jun 22]
Agro Chișinău 7–1 Energhetic Dubăsari
(Belan-2, Svaga-2, Soimu-2, Frunze - Topalo)

References
 Moldova. Second Level 1997/98 - RSSSF

External links
 "A" Division - moldova.sports.md

Moldovan Liga 1 seasons
2
Moldova